Labin (Italian/Istriot: Albona) is a town in Istria, west Croatia, with a town population of 5,806 (2021) and 10,424 in the greater municipality (which also includes the small towns of Rabac and Vinež, as well as a number of smaller villages).

History

Labin developed from the site of the Roman settlement of Albona. Its name predates classical antiquity and is derived from Proto-Indo-European *alb- ("eminence", "hill"). Before and under the Roman occupation, Albona was an important commune. On a marble tablet the Roman inscription we read that under the Emperor Marco Iulio Severo Filippo noble Caesar noble Prince made Albona a Republic. To be a republic it had to have two joined Magistrates called Duumviri and Public officers called Aediles which took care of Public buildings and other official duties.

From 1295 it was under the rule of the dukes of Pazin, and from 1381 it found itself under the jurisdiction of the Patriarchate of Aquileia. From 1420 until 1797 it was ruled from the Republic of Venice and after that belonged to Austrian Empire until 1918, when it was annexed to the Kingdom of Italy. Labin, as a Croatian-speaking town, was for a long time the centre of Croatia's largest coal mining district, with four mines operating at the height of its production. In March and April 1921, the town was the scene of a miners' strike which quickly grew into an anti-fascist rebellion, considered to be the first of its kind, and the declaration of the short-lived Labin Republic . The mine in downtown Labin closed in 1989. The large, coal-fired power plant in nearby Plomin now has its coal imported from outside sources once the mines were closed. After the Treaty of Peace with Italy, 1947, Labin, like the whole of Istria, was annexed to Yugoslavia. 

The famous Lutheran reformer Matthias Flacius Illyricus (3 March 1520 – 11 March 1575), was born in Labin and a small exhibition in what was once his house, commemorates this. Unfortunately, due to the counter-reformation, he was forced to live most of his life in exile in Germany where he became the undisputed leader of the conservative wing of the Lutheran movement after the death of Luther. His chief literary legacy was in the area of biblical exegesis.

Population

Settlements 
The town's administrative area consists of 17 settlements:
Bartići 
Breg
 Duga Luka
 Gondolići
 Gora Glušići
 Kapelica
 Kranjci
 Labin
 Marceljani
 Presika
 Rabac
 Ripenda Kosi
 Ripenda Kras
 Ripenda Verbanci
 Rogočana
 Salakovci
 Vinež

Demographics

Climate

Culture 
Language

Labinjonska Cakavica, one of the most interesting and oldest Istrian dialects spoken in and around the town of Labin. It belongs to Northern Chakavian dialect of the Chakavian variety of Croatian. It differs from the usual Chakavian (with typical pronoun "ča") because it lacks most palatals, with other parallel deviations called "tsakavism" (cakavizam).
In 2019, by the decision of the Ministry of Culture, Labinjonska Cakavica became a protected intangible cultural asset of the Republic of Croatia.

Sport
The city is the home of football club NK Rudar Labin, and handball clubs ŽRK Rudar Labin and RK Mladi Rudar Labin.

Notable people
Artists
 Mate Balota (1898–1963), poet, novelist and economist, whose mother was from Labin
 Franka Batelić-Ćorluka (born 1992), singer and songwriter
 Orlando Mohorović (born 1950), artist
 Renato Percan (1936–2013), painter

Handball players
 Tino Černjul (born 1973), left back, played for RK Zamet at intervals from 1995 to 2005
 Valner Franković (born 1968), international player for Croatia
 Evelina Galo, international player for Yugoslavia
 Suzana Golja-Zulijani, international player for Croatia
 Valter Marković (born 1959), played for RK Zamet from 1975 until 1987
 Fran Mileta (born 2000), right winger, international player for Croatia
 Mladen Prskalo (born 1968), pivot, international player for Croatia
 Luka Stepančić (born 1990), right back, international player for Croatia

HNK Rijeka footballers
 Mario Brnjac (1944–2007), football defender
 Vlado Golja, football forward
 Anđelo Milevoj (born 1941), footballer defender
 Josip Mohorović (born 1948), football midfielder
 Roberto Paliska (born 1963), football defender
 Andrej Prskalo (born 1987), football goalkeeper
 Davor Radmanović (born 1957), football midfielder
 Sergio Stemberga (born 1942), football defender
 Valentino Stepčić (born 1990), football midfielder
 Bruno Veselica (1936–2018), football forward

Science and humanities
 Matteo Bartoli (1873–1946), linguist
 Josip Belušić (1847–1905), inventor and professor, invented the speedometer
 Matthias Flacius (1520–1575), Lutheran reformer
 Baldo Lupetino (1502–1556), protestant preacher
 Giuseppina Martinuzzi (1844–1925), pedagogue

Others
 Antonio Bollani, Venetian general, whose mother was from Labin, who distinguished himself in the war with the Ottoman Turks (1645–1669)
 Ema Derossi-Bjelajac (1926–2020), politician,  President of the Presidency of the Socialist Republic of Croatia, first woman to hold a title equivalent to a head of state in modern-day Croatia

Administration and politics

Mayor 
The current mayor of Labin is Valter Glavičić (IDS), elected in the 2021 Labin local elections which were held on 16 May 2021. There is one deputy mayor elected from the same list, Federika Mohorović Čekada.

Municipal Council 
The Labin Council is composed of 15 representatives, elected in the 2021 Labin local elections.

The political groups represented in the Council (as of June 2021):

Councils of Local Committees 
In 2020, elections were held for the councils of all seven local committees of the City of Labin.

International relations 
Twin towns – sister cities

  Idrija, Slovenia

  Manzano, Italy
  Sospirolo, Italy
  Carbonia, Italy
  Baja, Hungary
  Sandnes, Norway

Partnerships

  Banovići, BiH
  Rybnik, Poland

See also 
Labinština
Labin Republic

References

Sources

External links

  
 Labin.com is the first site about Labin 
 Labin.biz - search engine for small businesses registered in Labin   

Cities and towns in Croatia
Populated coastal places in Croatia
Populated places in Istria County
Illyrian Croatia